Police Academy: Mission to Moscow is a 1994 American action comedy film starring George Gaynes, Michael Winslow, David Graf, and Claire Forlani (in her feature film debut). It is the seventh and final installment in the Police Academy franchise to date, and sequel to Police Academy 6: City Under Siege. The film was directed by Alan Metter and written by Randolph Davis and Michele S. Chodos. George Gaynes, Michael Winslow, and David Graf were the only three cast members to appear in all seven films.

Plot 
Russian mafia boss Konstantine Konali (Ron Perlman) is laundering money under the guise of a legitimate business. A highly addictive video game that allows him to bring down almost any security system controlled by a computer on which the game has been played, with a string of major robberies as the result.

Desperate to apprehend Konali, Russian Commandant Alexandrei Nikolaivich Rakov (Christopher Lee) sends for help from America. Rakov decides to bring in someone he met at a police convention, Commandant Eric Lassard (George Gaynes).

Lassard briefs his team about the mission in Russia, then they head to Moscow. Along with Lassard in Moscow are Sergeant Larvell Jones (Michael Winslow), Sergeant Eugene Tackleberry (David Graf), Captain Debbie Callahan (Leslie Easterbrook), Cadet Kyle Connors (Charlie Schlatter), and Captain Thaddeus Harris (G. W. Bailey).

As they plan to capture Konali, he has devised a new scheme: to create an even more addictive version of the game, which can bring down any computer security system in the world, including the systems that protect the databases which belong to world powers.

Cast

Officers on the Mission to Moscow
 Michael Winslow as Sergeant Larvell Jones
 David Graf as Sergeant Eugene Tackleberry
 Leslie Easterbrook as Captain Debbie Callahan
 George Gaynes as Commandant Eric Lassard
 G. W. Bailey as Captain Thaddeus Harris
 Charlie Schlatter as Cadet Kyle Connors

The Russians
 Christopher Lee as Commandant Aleksandr Nikolaevich Rakov
 Ron Perlman as Konstantin Konali
 Claire Forlani as Katrina Sergeeva
 Gregg Berger as Lieutenant Yuri Talinsky
 Alexander Skorokhod as President of Russia Boris Yeltsin
 Vladimir Dolinsky as Bellboy
 Maria Vinogradova as Old Woman With A Bag In Gorky Park
 Nikolai Pastukhov as Head of The Family
 Allyn Ann McLerie as Irina Petrovskaya
 Lonnie Burr as Gay Moscovite

Others
 Richard Israel as Adam Sharp
 Pamela Guest as Lindsay
 Stuart Nisbet as Ed
 David St. James as News Director

Production 
The shooting of the film took place in Russia in the fall of 1993. According to the behind-the-scenes featurette Underneath the Mission, included on the DVD release, this was one of the first American-produced comedy films to be allowed to film in post-Soviet Russia itself, with scenes filmed involving the Bolshoi Ballet, and on Red Square. Production was temporarily halted due to the October 1993 constitutional crisis and the damaged White House, Moscow is clearly visible in one scene. Despite the conflict, production was allowed to resume with one of the first scenes after the conflict being filmed at Moscow's airport. According to an interview with Michael Winslow, in the Underneath the Mission featurette, the scene where he performs bike tricks involved him wearing a wireless microphone in order to pick up his comedic sound effects. Unknown to the production crew, the frequency used by the microphone was the same as that used by the military, resulting in officials descending upon the film crew (though the incident ended on friendly terms, says Paul Maslansky).

Reception

Box office
Mission to Moscow was barely released to theaters. Unlike all the other Police Academy films, Warner Bros. only released the picture in a token, limited run, grossing a scant $126,247 in the U.S., making it the least successful movie in the series.

Critical response
On Rotten Tomatoes the film has an approval rating of 0% based on reviews from 7 critics. On Metacritic the film has a score of 11% based on reviews from 4 critics, indicating "overwhelming dislike". According to film historian Leonard Maltin, "If the United States and Soviet Union were still at odds, this film would make a great weapon...it could bore people to death."

References

External links 
 
 
 

 7
1994 films
1990s police comedy films
1994 action comedy films
American sequel films
Films set in Moscow
Films shot in Moscow
Warner Bros. films
Films scored by Robert Folk
Films directed by Alan Metter
Cultural depictions of Boris Yeltsin
1994 comedy films
Films produced by Paul Maslansky
Films about the Russian Mafia
Films about video games
1990s English-language films
1990s American films